Ovde (trans. Here) is the sixteenth studio album from Serbian and former Yugoslav rock band Riblja Čorba, released in 2003.

The album featured a bonus CD with explicit lyrics songs "Zašto uvek kurcu sviram" and "Pičkin dim".

Ovde is Riblja Čorba's first album that featured the band's current keyboardist Nikola Zorić who replaced Vlada Barjaktarević. However, the album was recorded by Barjaktarević.

Album cover
The album cover, designed by Jugoslav and Jakša Vlahović, features a drowning man displaying Serbian three-finger salute.

Track listing

Bonus disc

Personnel
Bora Đorđević - vocals
Vidoja Božinović - guitar
Miša Aleksić - bass guitar, co-producer
Vicko Milatović - drums
Nikola Zorić - keyboard

Additional personnel
Dejan Cukić - backing vocals
Momčilo Bajagić - backing vocals
Đorđe David - backing vocals
Biljana Krstić - backing vocals
Željko Savić - backing vocals
Aleksandar Petković - saxophone
Milan Popović - producer
Vlada Barjaktarević - recorded by
Uroš Marković - recorded by
Oliver Jovanović - mastered by, post-production

References 

Ovde at Discogs
 EX YU ROCK enciklopedija 1960-2006,  Janjatović Petar;

External links 
Ovde at Discogs

Riblja Čorba albums
2003 albums
Hi-Fi Centar albums